Bertha is a female given name.

It can also refer to:

Places 
In the United States
 Bertha, Florida,  an unincorporated community
 Bertha, Minnesota, a city
 Bertha, Missouri, an unincorporated community
 Bertha, Nebraska, an unincorporated community
 Bertha, Virginia, an unincorporated community
 Bertha, West Virginia, an unincorporated community
 Bertha Township, Todd County, Minnesota

Elsewhere
 Bertha (Perth), former Roman fortress in Scotland
 Bertha Island, Mac. Robertson Land, Antarctica
 154 Bertha, an asteroid
 Bertha Memorial Garden, Hong Kong

Entertainment 
 Bertha (TV series), stop-motion animated BBC children's series of 13 parts from the crew from Postman Pat
 Bertha (opera), an opera by Ned Rorem
 "Bertha" (song), by the Grateful Dead
 Bertha (Pokémon), a character in the Pokémon universe
Bertha Antonietta Mason, a minor supporting character in Charlotte Brontë's classic novel Jane Eyre, where she is depicted as the mentally ill wife of Mr. Edward Rochester

Other uses
 Hurricane Bertha (disambiguation), multiple hurricanes
 a Victorian type of ladies' collar (clothing)
 Bertha or Berta language, spoken in Sudan and Ethiopia
 Bertha (tunnel boring machine), a machine made by Hitachi Zosen Corporation for the Alaskan Way Viaduct replacement tunnel project in Seattle
 Bertha (drag boat), steam-powered boat built in 1844 to remove silt from the Port of Bridgwater

See also
Big Bertha (disambiguation)
Berta (disambiguation)
Birtha (disambiguation)